The 2021 Athletissima was the 45th edition of the annual outdoor track and field meeting in Lausanne, Switzerland. It was held on the 25th and 26 August 2021 at the Stade Olympique de la Pontaise. The men's high jump event was held on the 25th of August in the city centre of Lausanne. 30 events were contested in total with 14 events being point-scoring Diamond League disciplines.

Diamond League results
Athletes competing in the Diamond League disciplines earned points which counted towards qualification for the 2021 Diamond League final, to be held in Zurich from 8–9 September 2021. First place in an event earned eight points, with each succeeding place earning one less point than the previous, with no points being awarded for ninth place and lower.

Men

Women

References

External links

Diamond League - Lausanne Official website

Athletissima
Athletissima
Athletissima